Dame Phyllis Muriel Friend,  (28 September 1922 – 24 June 2013) was a British nurse and nursing officer.

She spent much of her professional career at the Royal London Hospital where she received her basic nursing education (circa 1943) and undertook Part I Midwifery Training. She held the posts of ward sister, nurse tutor (1948) and Assistant Matron at 'The London' (1954) before becoming deputy matron at St. George's Hospital, London in 1956. In 1959 she returned to the London Hospital as Matron Designate, in 1961 she became matron and 1969 she was appointed Chief Nursing Officer of the London Hospital Group.

In 1964, the Royal London was the first to install its own computer system; a development in which Friend was heavily involved. She later was appointed Chief Nursing Officer at the Department of Health and Social Security in London, a post she held until she retired in 1982. In this position she extended the nursing influence at government level and demonstrated deep concern for the advancement of nursing and high standards of care.

Honours/awards
For her services to nursing she was created a Commander of the Order of the British Empire in 1972 and a Dame Commander of the Order of the British Empire in 1980. She was made a Fellow of the Royal College of Nursing in 1980.

Dame Phyllis Friend Award
The Dame Phyllis Friend Award is awarded annually in recognition of the work of nurses using information and communications technology to support care. It results from an extremely kind donation by Dame Phyllis herself to the Nursing Specialist Group, part of the Health Informatics Forum of the British Computer Society.

References

External links
Phyllis Friend profile, University of Sheffield
Blog in re Award application information
Nursing.British Computer Society Nursing Specialist Group

1922 births
2013 deaths
Nurses from London
British nursing administrators
Philanthropists from London
Dames Commander of the Order of the British Empire
Fellows of the Royal College of Nursing
Place of birth missing
20th-century British philanthropists
NHS Chief Professional Officers
20th-century women philanthropists
British nurses